Peter Gerard Verhoeven (born February 15, 1959) is a retired American professional basketball player.

He was selected by the Portland Trail Blazers in the 1981 NBA draft and played for four teams throughout his six-year NBA career, averaging 3.5 points and 2.3 rebounds a game.

Born in Hanford, California, he played collegiately at Fresno State University until 1981, and in 2006 was inducted into the Fresno Athletic Hall of Fame.

Notes

External links
NBA stats at basketballreference.com

1959 births
Living people
American expatriate basketball people in Spain
American men's basketball players
Basketball players from California
Charleston Gunners players
Fresno State Bulldogs men's basketball players
Golden State Warriors players
Indiana Pacers players
Kansas City Kings players
Liga ACB players
People from Hanford, California
Portland Trail Blazers players
Small forwards